Kafayat Oyetola is a humanitarian, philanthropist, and wife of Adegboyega Oyetola, the 9th Governor of Osun State, Nigeria. She assumed office as 1st Lady of Osun state on the 27th of November, 2018 after the swearing-in of Mr Oyetola as the Executive Governor of the state.

Early life and academics 
Kafayat was born April 2, 1960 in Oshogbo and attended All Saints Primary School, Oshogbo from 1966 to 1971. She proceeded to Oshogbo Grammar School between 1973 and 1977, after which she attended "The College Wiltshire England" in 1978 for her O'levels before returning to Nigeria. On returning to Nigeria, she attended Kaduna Polytechnic for her OND between 1979 to 1982 before graduating  from Yaba College of Technology, where she studied Printing Technology in 1983 - 1985.  

She has childhood dreams of becoming a lawyer, and in an interview granted to Punch News Papers, she still nurses a desire to study law.

Career  
Kafayat has a professional  career in the printing industry: 

 Paste up artist with The Punch Nigeria Limited on industrial attachment in 1981 
 The Concord Press paste up artist in 1982 
 Lithographer for The Litramed Publication Oregun Lagos 1982 to 1983 
 Lithographer The Guardian newspaper during her NYSC 1985 to1986 
 Estimator for The Guardian Express Newspaper  (subsidiary guardian) 1986 to 1989 
 Production manager Ibukunoluwa Prints Nigeria Limited 1990 to 1992 

Shortly after she returned from the UK, she traveled to Kaduna for a visit, during which she met Adeboyega Oyetola and years later, got married. They have four children; three daughters and a son.

Ilerioluwa Development Initiative 

She is the founder and President of Ilerioluwa Development Initiative,  an NGO focused on providing assistance to less privileged women and children in Nigeria.

See also 

 List of first ladies of Nigerian states

References 

Living people
1960 births

Osun State politicians
Yoruba women in politics

Nigerian humanitarians
Spouses of Nigerian state governors